Blackboy Hill may refer to: 
Blackboy Hill, Bristol, a part of Whiteladies Road, Bristol in England
Blackboy Hill, Western Australia